Goh Leong San (born 15 November 1967) is a Malaysian politician. Goh is a former Malacca State Legislative Assemblyman (MLA) for several Malacca state constituencies; Tengkera (1995-2004), Bandar Hilir (2004-2008), Kesidang (2008-2013) and Duyong (2013-2018).

Presently Goh is an independent politician after his resignation from Democratic Action Party (DAP) in 2017. He was previously the state chairman for Malacca and also Central Executive Committee member for DAP.

Early life and education
Goh was born on 15 November 1967 in Malacca. His name, Leong San, literally means "Hero of Mount Liang" in Chinese, a name that also was used in the famous Chinese classical novel Water Margin.

He completed his tertiary education at Universiti Sains Malaysia (USM) obtaining the Bachelor of Science and Master of Science in Chemistry. He then became a chemist and household products manufacturer.

Political career
Goh had joined the DAP in 1994. He contested the constituency of Tengkera twice and won in 1995 and 1999 to become its assemblyman from 1995 to 2004 before switching to contest the seat Bandar Hilir, Malacca in 2004 election. 

Goh ascended to the DAP Malacca State Chief in 2005, succeeding his mentor Sim Tong Him. Goh had secured 85 votes in the hotly contested party internal election, which also saw DAP secretary-general Lim Guan Eng and his wife Betty Chew unexpectedly got the lowest number of votes out of 15 candidates, thus causing Chew to lose her seat on the Malacca DAP committee entirely. Chew was "saddened by the results", but said she accepted her defeat. However, Teresa Kok, a DAP Member of Parliament (MP), suggested there was a conspiracy behind the defeat of Lim and Chew in their re-election campaigns.  Both Goh and Sim DAP membership was suspended for one-year suspension on 16 February 2016, reportedly for disparaging the party. Goh was initially alleged to turn Independent assemblyman but somehow refuted by DAP which maintained he was still a member under suspension of the party later. 

In the 2008 election, Goh at age 40 continued to run for state assemblyman seat and had won again against incumbent Koh Nai Kwong of MCA-BN in the electoral constituency of Kesidang with margin of 1,399 votes 

In the 2013 election, he faced off against Gan Tian Loo from MCA-BN for the Duyong, Malacca state seat and won again, though by a much smaller margin of just 205 votes. He however later resigned as state opposition leader in October 2013.

Goh himself was ousted as the state DAP chief on 14 December 2015 by the newly-elected state committee that had selected Tey Kok Kiew instead.

On 12 February 2017, Goh along with Sim, MP for Kota Melaka and two other Malacca state assemblymen namely Lim Jack Wong of Bachang, and Chin Choong Seong of Kesidang finally decided and announced their resignation from the DAP to be Independents, citing lack of trust in the party leadership. They later had formed an independent candidates bloc called 'Justice League' to contest in the 2018 election (GE14) using the key as their common symbol but all had lost. In the elections, Goh contested as independent candidate the parliamentary constituency of Kota Melaka and state constituency of Bandar Hilir concurrently but had lost both constituencies. 

Hence, even though Goh never get to be a MP of Dewan Rakyat, he had become a five-term assemblyman of various state seats from 2004 until 2018.

Controversies
On 17 September 2015, Dr. Wong Fort Pin, the Bukit Palah DAP branch chairman who is also a doctor then, successfully sued Goh with Sim for defamation because of libelous media statements they have issued to implicate him in outraging the modesty of his patients and also accused his sibling of being involved in illegal activities. He won RM300,000 in damages.

Personal life
Goh is married and a father of three children.

Election results

References

Living people
1967 births
People from Malacca
Malaysian politicians of Chinese descent
Independent politicians in Malaysia
Former Democratic Action Party (Malaysia) politicians
Leaders of the Opposition in the Malacca State Legislative Assembly
Members of the Malacca State Legislative Assembly
21st-century Malaysian politicians